The 1981 Fresno State Bulldogs football team represented California State University, Fresno as a member of the Pacific Coast Athletic Association (PCAA) during the 1981 NCAA Division I-A football season. Led by fourth-year head coach Jim Sweeney, Fresno State compiled an overall record of 5–6 with a mark of 2–3 in conference play, tying for third place in the PCAA. The Bulldogs played their home games at Bulldog Stadium in Fresno, California.

Schedule

Team players in the NFL
The following were selected in the 1982 NFL Draft.

References

Fresno State
Fresno State Bulldogs football seasons
Fresno State Bulldogs football